Flavia Pennetta was the defending champion, but lost in the final to Venus Williams, 6–1, 6–2.

Seeds

Draw

Finals

Top half

Bottom half

External links
 WTA tournament draws

Abierto Mexicano Telcel - Women's Singles
2009 Abierto Mexicano Telcel